The Male Animal is a 1942 American comedy-drama film produced by Warner Bros., starring Henry Fonda, Olivia de Havilland and Joan Leslie.

The film was based on a hit 1940 Broadway play of the same name written by James Thurber and Elliott Nugent. The screenplay was written by Stephen Morehouse Avery, Julius J. Epstein, and Philip G. Epstein, based on Nugent and Thurber's play. The film was also directed by Elliott Nugent.

Plot 
Tommy Turner (Henry Fonda) is an English teacher at football-crazed Midwestern University. Although he is uninvolved with the politics of the day, Tommy suddenly finds himself the center of a free-speech debate on campus. An editorial in a student magazine praises him for planning to read Bartolomeo Vanzetti's sentencing statement to his class as an example of eloquent composition, even in broken English composed by a non-professional.

The school's conservative trustees, led by Ed Keller (Eugene Pallette) threaten to fire Tommy if he doesn't withdraw the reading from his lecture. The subject of free speech and Tommy's dilemma of conscience anchor the dramatic subplot's social significance. The lighter comic triangle plot concerns a return visit to attend the big football game by Joe Ferguson (Jack Carson), a former football hero and onetime love interest of Turner's wife Ellen (Olivia de Havilland). Joe is recently divorced and he rekindles Ellen's romantic notions at the very moment when her marriage to Tommy is being tested by the events on campus.

Cast 
 Henry Fonda as Tommy Turner
 Olivia de Havilland as Ellen Turner
 Joan Leslie as Patricia Stanley
 Jack Carson as Joe Ferguson
 Eugene Pallette as Ed Keller
 Herbert Anderson as Michael Barnes
 Hattie McDaniel as Cleota
 Ivan Simpson as Dean Frederick Damon
 Don DeFore as Wally Myers
 Jean Ames as "Hot Garters" Gardner
 Minna Phillips as Mrs. Blanche Damon
 Regina Wallace as Mrs. Myrtle Keller
 Frank Mayo as Coach Sprague
 William B. Davidson as Alumnus
 Bobby Barnes as Nutsy Miller

Production 
Gene Tierney, who had starred as Patricia Stanley in the original Broadway production, was unable to appear in the film because she was contracted to star in John Ford's movie version of Tobacco Road. Don DeFore, another member of the Broadway cast, repeated his role in the film. Co-writer Elliott Nugent played the lead role on the stage before coming to Hollywood to direct Henry Fonda in the film version. Gig Young, who changed his birth name / stage name, Byron Barr, that year, appears unbilled as a student.

Olivia de Havilland appeared in this film while simultaneously making They Died with Their Boots On (1941) starring Errol Flynn, putting the actress under enormous pressure from overwork.

Remake 
The Male Animal was loosely reworked by Warner Brothers as a musical called She's Working Her Way Through College (1952), starring Virginia Mayo and Ronald Reagan. In this adaptation, the characters' names are changed. Also, the political theme is discarded in favor of a conflict surrounding the professor's attempt to mount a musical play featuring a student who is discovered to be a former burlesque dancer.

The remake earned an estimated $2.4 million at the North American box office in 1952.

The remake features Gene Nelson and Phyllis Thaxter in the cast, as well as Don DeFore who had also been in The Male Animal.

References

External links 
 
 
 
 
 
 Song, "We Don't Give a Damn for the Whole State of Michigan"
 1953 Best Plays radio adaptation of original play at Internet Archive

1942 films
1942 romantic comedy films
American black-and-white films
American romantic comedy films
American satirical films
Films about educators
American films based on plays
Films based on works by James Thurber
Films directed by Elliott Nugent
Films set in universities and colleges
Warner Bros. films
Films scored by Heinz Roemheld
1940s English-language films
1940s American films
Films about freedom of expression
Works about Sacco and Vanzetti